The National Institute of Fundamental Studies (NIFS) is a government multidisciplinary research institute in Sri Lanka, established in 1981. The NIFS is the only Institute in Sri Lanka which exists for the sole purpose of conducting research in natural and social sciences and philosophy for national development and scientific advancement.

The NIFS is engaged in basic, high caliber research focusing on 16 different thematic research areas under 6 research departments. The research carried out at the NIFS is also initiated as a response to burning national problems in Sri Lanka.

Besides engaging in basic research, the NIFS popularizes science, especially among school children, trains postgraduate researchers in the country to prevent brain drain and disseminates scientific knowledge to the wider public.

History
NIFS was established in September 1981 by the Parliament Act No. 55 and shifted its location from Colombo to Kandy on 4 December 1985. Vidya Jyothi Professor Cyril Ponnamperuma was appointed as the director of the Institute of Fundamental Studies by President J. R. Jayewardena. He was instrumental in setting up the permanent home of the institute in the Hanthana Hills with a modern laboratory complex.

The name of the institute was changed to National Institute of Fundamental Studies (NIFS) Sri Lanka by the Act No. 25 of 2014.

Leadership

Board of Governors

The institute is administered by them. The board make rules for the procedures in the conduct of its affairs.

Board of Governors (2019 to date)

Prof. Athula Sumathipala (chairman)
Prof. Saman Seneweera – director, NIFS
Prof. Lakshman Dissanayake 
Dr. Nishantha Perera
Prof. Nilwala Kottegoda
Prof. Cassim Iqbal 
Prof. Namal Priyantha
Prof. Sampath Amaratunge
Science Advisor to H.E. the president (vacant)
Ms. Shiranthi Rathnayake
Dr. Padmakantha Wanduragala (secretary to the board)

Director

The director is the chief executive officer and the chief financial officer of the NIFS, exercises general supervision over the activities of all staff and students, promotes the interests and furthers the development of the institute.

Directors

Prof. Saman Seneweera – 2017 to date
Prof. Parakrama Karunaratne
Prof. Chandra Dissanayake
Prof. Kirthi Tennakone
Prof. Cyril Ponnamperuma 
Prof. Chandra Wickramasinghe

Research Council
The Research Council has control over the general direction of research and forwards its recommendations to the board of governors.

References

External links
 

Research institutes in Sri Lanka
1981 establishments in Sri Lanka